The following species in the flowering plant genus Ocotea are currently accepted by Plants of the World Online. It is probably paraphyletic.

Ocotea abbreviata 
Ocotea acarina 
Ocotea aciphylla 
Ocotea acuminatissima 
Ocotea acunana 
Ocotea acutangula 
Ocotea acutifolia 
Ocotea adamantina 
Ocotea adela 
Ocotea adenotrachelium 
Ocotea adusta 
Ocotea alaris 
Ocotea albescens 
Ocotea albida 
Ocotea albigemma 
Ocotea albopunctulata 
Ocotea aligra 
Ocotea alnifolia 
Ocotea alpina 
Ocotea alveata 
Ocotea amazonica 
Ocotea ambrensis 
Ocotea amplifolia 
Ocotea amplissima 
Ocotea andina 
Ocotea aniboides 
Ocotea antioquiensis 
Ocotea aquila 
Ocotea arcuata 
Ocotea arenaria 
Ocotea arenicola 
Ocotea argentea 
Ocotea argyrea 
Ocotea argyrophylla 
Ocotea arnottiana 
Ocotea atacta 
Ocotea athroanthes 
Ocotea atirrensis 
Ocotea atlantica 
Ocotea atrata 
Ocotea aurantiodora 
Ocotea aureotomentosa 
Ocotea auriculata 
Ocotea auriculiformis 
Ocotea austinii 
Ocotea badia 
Ocotea bajapazensis 
Ocotea balanocarpa 
Ocotea bangii 
Ocotea baracoensis 
Ocotea barbatula 
Ocotea barbellata 
Ocotea basicordatifolia 
Ocotea basirecurva 
Ocotea batata 
Ocotea beekmanii 
Ocotea benthamiana 
Ocotea bernoulliana 
Ocotea betazensis 
Ocotea beulahiae 
Ocotea beyrichii 
Ocotea bicolor 
Ocotea bijuga 
Ocotea bissei 
Ocotea bofo 
Ocotea boissieriana 
Ocotea botrantha 
Ocotea bourgeauviana 
Ocotea brachybotrya 
Ocotea bracteosa 
Ocotea bragae 
Ocotea brenesii 
Ocotea brevipes 
Ocotea brevipetiolata 
Ocotea bucheri 
Ocotea bullata 
Ocotea caesariata 
Ocotea caesia 
Ocotea caesifolia 
Ocotea calliscypha 
Ocotea camphoromoea 
Ocotea canaliculata 
Ocotea candidovillosa 
Ocotea cantareirae 
Ocotea carabobensis 
Ocotea caracasana 
Ocotea carchiensis 
Ocotea cardinalis 
Ocotea catharinensis 
Ocotea caudatifolia 
Ocotea ceanothifolia 
Ocotea celastroides 
Ocotea chiapensis 
Ocotea choquetangensis 
Ocotea chrysobalanoides 
Ocotea cicatricosa 
Ocotea ciliata 
Ocotea cinerea 
Ocotea cissiflora 
Ocotea citrosmoides 
Ocotea clavigera 
Ocotea colophanthera 
Ocotea comata 
Ocotea commutata 
Ocotea comoriensis 
Ocotea complicata 
Ocotea condorensis 
Ocotea confertiflora 
Ocotea congestifolia 
Ocotea congregata 
Ocotea contrerasii 
Ocotea corethroides 
Ocotea corrugata 
Ocotea corymbosa 
Ocotea cowaniana 
Ocotea crassifolia 
Ocotea crassipedalis 
Ocotea crassiramula 
Ocotea crinita 
Ocotea cristalensis 
Ocotea cryptocarpa 
Ocotea cryptocaryoides 
Ocotea cuatrecasasii 
Ocotea cujumary 
Ocotea cuneata 
Ocotea cuneifolia 
Ocotea curucutuensis 
Ocotea cuscoensis 
Ocotea cuspidata 
Ocotea cymosa 
Ocotea daphnifolia 
Ocotea darcyi 
Ocotea debilis 
Ocotea deflexa 
Ocotea delicata 
Ocotea densiflora 
Ocotea dentata 
Ocotea depauperata 
Ocotea dielsiana 
Ocotea diffusa 
Ocotea diospyrifolia 
Ocotea discrepens 
Ocotea disjuncta 
Ocotea dispersa 
Ocotea divaricata 
Ocotea domatiata 
Ocotea dominicana 
Ocotea douradensis 
Ocotea duidensis 
Ocotea duplocolorata 
Ocotea dussii 
Ocotea effusa 
Ocotea eggersiana 
Ocotea ekmanii 
Ocotea elegans 
Ocotea elliptica 
Ocotea endresiana 
Ocotea erectifolia 
Ocotea eriothyrsa 
Ocotea esmeraldana 
Ocotea estrellensis 
Ocotea eucuneata 
Ocotea euryphylla 
Ocotea euvenosa 
Ocotea falcata 
Ocotea fasciculata 
Ocotea faucherei 
Ocotea felix 
Ocotea fendleri 
Ocotea fistulosa 
Ocotea flavantha 
Ocotea floribunda 
Ocotea foeniculacea 
Ocotea foetens 
Ocotea foveolata 
Ocotea froesii 
Ocotea frondosa 
Ocotea fulvescens 
Ocotea fusagasugensis 
Ocotea gabonensis 
Ocotea gardneri 
Ocotea gentryi 
Ocotea glaberrima 
Ocotea glabra 
Ocotea glabriflora 
Ocotea glauca 
Ocotea glaucophylla 
Ocotea glaucosericea 
Ocotea glaziovii 
Ocotea glomerata 
Ocotea gomezii 
Ocotea gordonii 
Ocotea gracilipes 
Ocotea gracilis 
Ocotea grandifructa 
Ocotea granulosa 
Ocotea grayi 
Ocotea guaramacalensis 
Ocotea guatemalensis 
Ocotea guianensis 
Ocotea gymnoblasta 
Ocotea haberi 
Ocotea hammeliana 
Ocotea harrisii 
Ocotea hartshorniana 
Ocotea hemsleyana 
Ocotea heribertoi 
Ocotea heterochroma 
Ocotea heydeana 
Ocotea hilariana 
Ocotea hirtandra 
Ocotea hirtistyla 
Ocotea hoehnei 
Ocotea holdridgeana 
Ocotea huberi 
Ocotea hueckii 
Ocotea humbertii 
Ocotea humblotii 
Ocotea hypoglauca 
Ocotea illustris 
Ocotea imazensis 
Ocotea immersa 
Ocotea imrayana 
Ocotea indecora 
Ocotea indirectinervia 
Ocotea infrafoveolata 
Ocotea inhauba 
Ocotea insignis 
Ocotea insularis 
Ocotea involuta 
Ocotea iridescens 
Ocotea itatiaiae 
Ocotea ivohibensis 
Ocotea jacquinii 
Ocotea jefensis 
Ocotea jelskii 
Ocotea jorge-escobarii 
Ocotea julianii 
Ocotea karsteniana 
Ocotea kenyensis 
Ocotea keriana 
Ocotea killipii 
Ocotea klotzschiana 
Ocotea kolera 
Ocotea kostermansiana 
Ocotea laetevirens 
Ocotea laevifolia 
Ocotea laevigata 
Ocotea lanata 
Ocotea lancifolia 
Ocotea lancilimba 
Ocotea langsdorffii 
Ocotea laticostata 
Ocotea latipetiolata 
Ocotea laxa 
Ocotea lenitae 
Ocotea lentii 
Ocotea leptobotra 
Ocotea leptophylla 
Ocotea leucophloea 
Ocotea leucoxylon 
Ocotea lherminieri 
Ocotea libanensis 
Ocotea liesneri 
Ocotea ligulata 
Ocotea limae 
Ocotea limiticola 
Ocotea lindbergii 
Ocotea lobbii 
Ocotea loefgrenii 
Ocotea longipedicellata 
Ocotea longipes 
Ocotea longipetiolata 
Ocotea loxensis 
Ocotea macrantha 
Ocotea macrocarpa 
Ocotea macrophylla 
Ocotea macropoda 
Ocotea madagascariensis 
Ocotea magnifolia 
Ocotea magnifrons 
Ocotea magnilimba 
Ocotea malcomberi 
Ocotea mandonii 
Ocotea mantiqueirae 
Ocotea maranguapensis 
Ocotea marcescens 
Ocotea marmellensis 
Ocotea martinicensis 
Ocotea marumbiensis 
Ocotea mascarena 
Ocotea matogrossensis 
Ocotea matudae 
Ocotea maximilianea 
Ocotea megacarpa 
Ocotea megaphylla 
Ocotea megistophylla 
Ocotea meyendorffiana 
Ocotea meziana 
Ocotea micans 
Ocotea micrantha 
Ocotea microbotrys 
Ocotea microneura 
Ocotea minarum 
Ocotea minor 
Ocotea minutiflora 
Ocotea moaensis 
Ocotea mollicella 
Ocotea mollifolia 
Ocotea mollivillosa 
Ocotea montana 
Ocotea monteverdensis 
Ocotea montis-insulae 
Ocotea monzonensis 
Ocotea moschata 
Ocotea mosenii 
Ocotea mucronata 
Ocotea multiflora 
Ocotea multinervis 
Ocotea munacensis 
Ocotea myriantha 
Ocotea neblinae 
Ocotea nectandrifolia 
Ocotea neesiana 
Ocotea nervosa 
Ocotea nigra 
Ocotea nigrescens 
Ocotea nigrita 
Ocotea nilssonii 
Ocotea nitida 
Ocotea nobilis 
Ocotea notata 
Ocotea nunesiana 
Ocotea nutans 
Ocotea obliqua 
Ocotea oblonga 
Ocotea oblongifolia 
Ocotea obovata 
Ocotea obovatifolia 
Ocotea obtusata 
Ocotea obtusifolia 
Ocotea odorata 
Ocotea odorifera 
Ocotea olivacea 
Ocotea oppositifolia 
Ocotea oreophila 
Ocotea orientalis 
Ocotea otara 
Ocotea ottoschmidtii 
Ocotea ovalifolia 
Ocotea pachypoda 
Ocotea pacifica 
Ocotea pajonalis 
Ocotea palaciosii 
Ocotea palcazuensis 
Ocotea papyracea 
Ocotea paranaensis 
Ocotea parvula 
Ocotea pastazensis 
Ocotea patula 
Ocotea pauciflora 
Ocotea pausiaca 
Ocotea pautensis 
Ocotea pedanomischa 
Ocotea pedicellata 
Ocotea pentagona 
Ocotea percoriacea 
Ocotea percurrens 
Ocotea perforata 
Ocotea perrobusta 
Ocotea persicifolia 
Ocotea petalanthera 
Ocotea pharomachrosorum 
Ocotea pichinchensis 
Ocotea pittieri 
Ocotea piurensis 
Ocotea platyphylla 
Ocotea pluridomatiata 
Ocotea polyantha 
Ocotea pomaderrioides 
Ocotea porosa 
Ocotea porphyria 
Ocotea portoricensis 
Ocotea praetermissa 
Ocotea producta 
Ocotea prolifera 
Ocotea prunifolia 
Ocotea pseudopalmana 
Ocotea psychotrioides 
Ocotea puberula 
Ocotea pulchella 
Ocotea pullifolia 
Ocotea pumila 
Ocotea purpurea 
Ocotea quadriporata 
Ocotea racemiflora 
Ocotea racemosa 
Ocotea ramosissima 
Ocotea raymondiana 
Ocotea recurvata 
Ocotea reticularis 
Ocotea revoluta 
Ocotea revolutifolia 
Ocotea rhodophylla 
Ocotea rhytidotricha 
Ocotea rigens 
Ocotea rigidifolia 
Ocotea rivularis 
Ocotea robertsoniae 
Ocotea rohweri 
Ocotea roseopedunculata 
Ocotea rotundata 
Ocotea rovirosae 
Ocotea rubrinervis 
Ocotea rufa 
Ocotea rufescens 
Ocotea rufotomentella 
Ocotea rufovestita 
Ocotea rugosa 
Ocotea rupestris 
Ocotea salvadorensis 
Ocotea salvinii 
Ocotea sambiranensis 
Ocotea sanariapensis 
Ocotea sandwithii 
Ocotea santamartae 
Ocotea sarcodes 
Ocotea sassafras 
Ocotea satipensis 
Ocotea sauroderma 
Ocotea scabrella 
Ocotea scalariformis 
Ocotea scandens 
Ocotea schomburgkiana 
Ocotea schwackeana 
Ocotea semicompleta 
Ocotea sericea 
Ocotea serrana 
Ocotea sessiliflora 
Ocotea silvae 
Ocotea silvestris 
Ocotea sinaiana 
Ocotea sinuata 
Ocotea smithiana 
Ocotea smithii 
Ocotea sodiroana 
Ocotea solomonii 
Ocotea spanantha 
Ocotea spathulata 
Ocotea spectabilis 
Ocotea sperata 
Ocotea spixiana 
Ocotea splendens 
Ocotea sprucei 
Ocotea squarrosa 
Ocotea staminoides 
Ocotea standleyi 
Ocotea stenoneura 
Ocotea stenophylla 
Ocotea strigosa 
Ocotea stuebelii 
Ocotea suaveolens 
Ocotea subalata 
Ocotea subparamicola 
Ocotea subrutilans 
Ocotea subterminalis 
Ocotea subtriplinervia 
Ocotea sulcata 
Ocotea tabacifolia 
Ocotea tampicensis 
Ocotea tarapotana 
Ocotea tarmensis 
Ocotea teleiandra 
Ocotea tenella 
Ocotea tenera 
Ocotea tenuiflora 
Ocotea terciopelo 
Ocotea teresae 
Ocotea tessmannii 
Ocotea thinicola 
Ocotea thouvenotii 
Ocotea tillettsiana 
Ocotea tomentella 
Ocotea tomentosa 
Ocotea tonduzii 
Ocotea tonii 
Ocotea tovarensis 
Ocotea trematifera 
Ocotea trichantha 
Ocotea trichophlebia 
Ocotea trinidadensis 
Ocotea tristis 
Ocotea truncata 
Ocotea tsaratananensis 
Ocotea tubulosa 
Ocotea ucayalensis 
Ocotea umbrina 
Ocotea urbaniana 
Ocotea uxpanapana 
Ocotea vaccinioides 
Ocotea vaginans 
Ocotea valerioana 
Ocotea valerioides 
Ocotea vanderwerffii 
Ocotea vasquezii 
Ocotea vegrandis 
Ocotea velloziana 
Ocotea velutina 
Ocotea venosa 
Ocotea venulosa 
Ocotea verapazensis 
Ocotea vergelensis 
Ocotea verticillata 
Ocotea viburnoides 
Ocotea villosa 
Ocotea virgultosa 
Ocotea viridiflora 
Ocotea weberbaueri 
Ocotea whitei 
Ocotea wilhelminae 
Ocotea wrightii 
Ocotea wurdackiana 
Ocotea xanthocalyx 
Ocotea yutajensis 
Ocotea zahamenensis 
Ocotea zoque

References

Ocotea